A family of computer models is said to be compatible if certain software that runs on one of the models can also be run on all other models of the family. The computer models may differ in performance, reliability or some other characteristic. These differences may affect the outcome of the running of the software.

Software compatibility 
Software compatibility can refer to the compatibility that a particular software has running on a particular CPU architecture such as Intel or PowerPC. Software compatibility can also refer to ability for the software to run on a particular operating system. Very rarely is a compiled software compatible with multiple different CPU architectures. Normally, an application is compiled for different CPU architectures and operating systems to allow it to be compatible with the different system. Interpreted software, on the other hand, can normally run on many different CPU architectures and operating systems if the interpreter is available for the architecture or operating system. Software incompatibility occurs many times for new software released for a newer version of an operating system which is incompatible with the older version of the operating system because it may miss some of the features and functionality that the software depends on.

Hardware compatibility 
Hardware compatibility can refer to the compatibility of computer hardware components with a particular CPU architecture, bus, motherboard or operating system. Hardware that is compatible may not always run at its highest stated performance, but it can nevertheless work with legacy components. An example is RAM chips, some of which can run at a lower (or sometimes higher) clock rate than rated. Hardware that was designed for one operating system may not work for another, if device or kernel drivers are unavailable. As an example, much of the hardware for macOS is proprietary hardware with drivers unavailable for use in operating systems such as Linux.

Free and open-source software

See also 
 Binary-code compatibility
 Compatibility layer
 Interchangeability
 Forward compatibility
 Backward compatibility
 Cross-platform
 Emulator
 List of computer standards
 Portability
 Plug compatible
 Hardware security

References 

Interoperability
Computer hardware
Software